Paulo Roberto Correia (born 14 February 1960) is a Brazilian sprinter. He competed in the men's 100 metres at the 1984 Summer Olympics.

References

External links
 

1960 births
Living people
Athletes (track and field) at the 1980 Summer Olympics
Athletes (track and field) at the 1984 Summer Olympics
Brazilian male sprinters
Olympic athletes of Brazil
Place of birth missing (living people)
Universiade medalists in athletics (track and field)
Universiade bronze medalists for Brazil